Super Discount is the debut album by French DJ and producer Étienne de Crécy, released on 16 October 1996 by record label Different. Although the track listing lists several artists, the majority of the credited artists are aliases for de Crécy alone or in collaboration. The album was followed in 2004 by the sequel release Super Discount 2.

Reception

In 1997, Q ranked the album in their list of "The 25 Best Dance Albums Ever".

Track listing

References

1997 albums
Étienne de Crécy albums